Sharpshin Island ("Sharkskin Island" on some maps) is an island on the Potomac River in Maryland.

Geography
Sharpshin Island is located less than a mile upstream (northwest) from Riley's Lock, which is Lock 24 on the C and O canal.  
The island itself is about two hundred yards long and very narrow, not more than fifty feet at its widest point. Like many of the islands on the Potomac, it has a flat beach at its head, a fairly open area, then denser foliage and trees toward the middle and to the foot.
A convenient landing point is the small sandy beach about fifty feet downstream from the head, on the Maryland side. Walking up to the middle of the island one comes upon a small campsite complete with fire ring.  
The head of the island lies across from a boat ramp on the Virginia side; many power boaters and jet-skiers launch from here as well as from Riley's Lock.  Dulles Airport is also fairly close, so many planes can be observed flying across (usually north or south), but they are high enough not to be a nuisance.

Flora and fauna
Sharpshin Island has the usual variety of Potomac flora and fauna. Painted turtles sunning themselves, great blue herons flying across the water, Canada geese and ducks swimming by can often be seen, and one may even be lucky enough to hear an owl at night or see a white-tailed deer swimming to the mainland. For visitors to Sharpshin Island who are allergic to poison ivy, caution is advised, as it is abundant there.

See also
List of islands of Maryland
List of islands on the Potomac River

River islands of Maryland
Landforms of Montgomery County, Maryland
Islands of the Potomac River